A jester is a type of entertainer.

Jester may also refer to:

Arts and entertainment

Characters
 Jester (Marvel Comics), a supervillain
 Jester (Quality Comics), a superhero
 Jester (Puppet Master)
 Jester, a character in the Oz book series by L. Frank Baum
 Jester Lavorre, a tiefling cleric player character in web series Critical Role
 Jester, a Devil May Cry 3: Dante's Awakening character
 Jester, a Gauntlet Dark Legacy character class

Film
 The Jester (1937 film), a Polish musical comedy
The Jester (1988 film), a Soviet drama film
 O Bobo, a 1987 Portuguese film with the English-language title The Jester

Literature
 The Jester (novel), by James Patterson
 Jester of Columbia or Jester, a humor magazine

Music
 Jester Records, a record label
 The Jesters (R&B band), a group from Athens, GA
 The Jesters, an American doo-wop group
 Jesters III, a band from  Gaffney, South Carolina
 "The Jester", a song by Sum 41 on the album Underclass Hero
 Jester, a 2017 album by Savant
 Jim Messina and His Jesters, a California-based surf band (See Jim Messina (musician))

Other arts and entertainment
 The Jesters (TV series), an Australian comedy series which aired in 2009 and 2011

Companies and organizations
 The Court Jesters, professional improv company based in Christchurch, New Zealand
 Newcastle Jesters, an English ice hockey team
 Royal Order of Jesters, a fraternal organization

People
 List of jesters, a list of court jesters
 Jester (surname), several people and a fictional character
 The Jester (hacktivist), computer vigilante
 Jester Hairston (1901–2000), American composer and actor
 "The Jester from Leicester", nickname of the English snooker player Mark Selby

Other uses
 The Jester (roller coaster), at Six Flags New Orleans
 Jester (sailboat)
 Jester Center, a University of Texas at Austin residence hall
 Jester Rock, Antarctica
 Jesters, butterflies of the genus Symbrenthia
 Common jester, Symbrenthia lilaea

See also
 Comedian (disambiguation)
 Comic (disambiguation)
 Court jester (disambiguation)
 Funny Man (disambiguation)
 Jest
 Joker (disambiguation)
 Jokester (disambiguation)
 Practical joker (disambiguation)